Alex Lang (12 March 1888 – 9 July 1943) was an Australian rules footballer who played with the Carlton Football Club in the Victorian Football League (VFL). Despite being a three-time premiership player, Lang will be remembered by history as the joint record holder for the longest player ban received from the tribunal.

Football
Recruited by coach Jack Worrall in 1905, Lang debuted for Carlton in the opening round of the following season. He played as a rover, winning premierships in his first three years at the club and in 1909 was voted by The Australasian newspaper as the most 'Outstanding player in the VFL'.

During the 1910 final series, Lang became involved in a match-fixing scandal after being dropped from the side for the Second Semi-Final, against South Melbourne. It had been alleged that he had accepted a bribe to play poorly, along with teammates Doug Gillespie and Doug Fraser. Both Carlton and the VFL launched their own investigations, and Lang admitted that an offer had been made to him. He claimed, however, that he did not intend on accepting it. Regardless of his plea of innocence, he was found guilty along with Fraser, and both were banned for 99 games, a total of five years. Doug Gillespie was exonerated and played in the club's losing Grand Final.

Lang returned to the game in 1916 and brought up his 100th game for Carlton. He retired the following season after playing only three games.

The story of his fall from grace is recounted in the 2020 book On the Take by Tony Joel and Mathew Turner.

Notes

External links

Blueseum: Alex Lang

1888 births
1943 deaths
Australian rules footballers from Melbourne
Australian Rules footballers: place kick exponents
Carlton Football Club players
Carlton Football Club Premiership players
Three-time VFL/AFL Premiership players
People from Carlton, Victoria
Australian people of Scottish descent